Brandywine Creek is a  tributary of Quittapahilla Creek in Lebanon County, Pennsylvania, in the United States.

It rises in northeastern Lebanon County and flows southwest through Lebanon, through the limestone hill country south of the Appalachian Mountains. It joins Quittapahilla Creek west of the center of Lebanon.

Stovers Dam  and Recreation Area is the principal landmark along Brandywine Creek.

See also
List of rivers of Pennsylvania

References

External links

Rivers of Pennsylvania
Tributaries of Swatara Creek
Rivers of Lebanon County, Pennsylvania